Gofrette is an animated children's television series, based on the series of children's books by Doris Brasset and Fabienne Michot. It is produced by Zoe Mae and Sub-Sequence Entertainment. Porchlight Entertainment distributed Gofrette on Qubo until 2017.

Plot
Gofrette is about a curious little cat who—along with his dog and bird best friends—lives through various adventures evoking the program's tag line: "... that busy, busy cat!"  The show takes place in the fictional mayorless town of Zanimo and is based on the original books written by Doris Brasset and Fabienne Michot.

Characters

Main
Gofrette.  A curious cat who makes every day in Zanimo an exciting day with his huge imagination, endless supply of hobby equipment, and a go-for-it attitude. He lives in a house with Red the Refrigerator to whom he talks and understands; with his stuffed animal, Long Ears; and with tiny, creatively active creatures he calls Gnugnuts. His uncle, Garbanzo, is an acrobat who owns and stars in El Teatro Zanimo circus.  Gofrette also has a grandmother, Granny Smith, who is only mentioned and shown in photographs. Gofrette's favorite exclamation is "Zowy!", sometimes with a variation such as, "Zowy zow zow!".

Fudge.  A dog with big floppy ears. Fudge is sometimes reluctant to get into what he thinks of as scary or embarrassing situations, but he is usually a good sport once participating. He is a bit fussy with his ears, and a source of his reluctance to participate in things. He owns a van called the Zanimo Wagon that he also lives in. He has been friends with Gofrette since they were a puppy and a kitten. He often uses the phrase, "Wowie Zowie Gofrette." He has an older brother named Moocher, who is a mechanic and artist. He is voiced by Sonja Ball. He is also known as "Blue" in books.

Ellie Coptor.  A pink bird with a propeller on her head that twirls depending on her mood.  She operates a hair salon in her treehouse and plays with a quite bit in fashion and makeovers. As best friends with Gofrette and Fudge, Ellie rounds out the trio with her fun, creative, and sometimes nervous—but always strong—personality. Ellie's favorite snack is worms which grosses out Fudge. She is voiced by Lucinda Davis.  She has an Aunt Edna who wrote a book (in the cartoon) called "Trapezee is for the birds".

Episodes
 "The Diving Lesson / Blue Torteloony" — 2008.11.03
 "Hot Chocolate Moose / Silence... and Action" — 2008.11.04
 "To Fly a Kite / Blueberry Fish Soup" — 2008.11.05
 "Finding Fudge / 3 Little Pigs" — 2008.11.06
 "For the Birds / Where's Long Ears" — 2008.11.07
 "A Day at the Beach / Surprise Party" — 2008.11.17
 "Zanimosaurus / Moocher Returns" — 2008.11.18
 "The Snail Race / Miss Know-It-All" — 2008.11.19
 "Monster Hunting / Starstruck" — 2008.11.20
 "Wendell's Makeover / The Birdysitter" — 2008.11.21
 "The Barber of Zanimo! / One Silly Fusilli Cat!" — 2008.12.01
 "The Pirates of Zanimo / The Falling Out" — 2008.12.02
 "Bellybutton Day! / Zippety Hair Do Day" — 2008.12.03
 "Red's Day Out / The Falling Star" — 2008.12.04
 "Crazy Flu! / Mystery Presents" — 2008.12.05
 "To Catch the Wind / Bike Rally" — 2008.12.06
 "Home Sweet Home / Zanimo Man" — 2008.12.07
 "Quicky Slows Down / The Scary Sleepover" — 2008.12.15
 "The Legend of The Zanimozopogo / Camping Diva" — 2008.12.16
 "Goodbye Fusillis / Super Hero's Super Sale" — 2008.12.17
 "The Blossom Tree / To the Top" — 2008.12.18
 "Mr. Babaloonie / To Catch a Cuckoo" — 2008.12.19
 "Butterfly Garden / Munching Plant" — 2008.12.20
 "The Crossing Guard / Wendell's Dinner" — 2008.12.21
 "Ride 'Em Cowboy / The Tricky Trickster" — 2009.01.04
 "The Disappearing Magician / The Stinky Cheese Thief" — 2009.01.11

References

External links

2000s Canadian animated television series
2008 Canadian television series debuts
2008 Canadian television series endings
2000s French animated television series
2008 French television series debuts
2008 French television series endings
2000s preschool education television series
Animated preschool education television series
Canadian children's animated fantasy television series
Canadian flash animated television series
Canadian preschool education television series
French children's animated fantasy television series
French flash animated television series
French preschool education television series
Animated television series about cats
Animated television series about children
English-language television shows
Canadian television shows based on children's books
French television shows based on children's books